Paul Brand is a Welsh journalist who is UK editor of ITV News. He has been presenter of current affairs programme Tonight since 2022. He was formerly a political correspondent for ITV News. He was central to the reporting on Partygate, a political scandal which culminated in the resignation of Prime Minister Boris Johnson.

Early and personal life
Brand grew up in Bridgend and St Athan, Wales. His mother trained as a solicitor. He grew up in the late 1980s and early 1990s. He attended his local comprehensive school, where he became head boy, and says he wanted to be a journalist from "about the age of 17 or 18". He attended the University of Oxford and received a bursary from ITV to study journalism at City, University of London.

Brand is married to civil servant Joe Cuddeford. They have a son, born through a surrogate mother.

Career
Brand began his career as a production journalist at ITV Wales. He worked as a reporter, before becoming a political correspondent for ITV Yorkshire and ITV Tyne Tees & Border. He then reported on politics for Good Morning Britain, and joined the network ITV News team in 2016. He became a political correspondent for ITV News. During the 2016 EU membership referendum, Brand was the first reporter to call the defining result in Sunderland as Leave. Brand co-founded the campaign School Diversity Week, and is a patron of the charity Just Like Us, both of which promote LGBT+ inclusivity in schools. He hosts the ITV News podcast Acting Prime Minister.

In July 2018 Brand got Prime Minister Theresa May to apologise for how she had voted on gay rights in the past.

Brand became UK editor of ITV News. He led an investigation for Tonight called Searching for Patient Zero: Britain's AIDS Tragedy, in which he uncovered the identity of the first recorded person to die of AIDS in the UK, John Eaddie. In November 2021 he presented a documentary about Eaddie.

He produced the first evidence of a party in Downing Street during a COVID-19 lockdown, when he reported of a party that took place in May 2020. He obtained footage of Downing Street staff at a December 2020 press conference rehearsal, in which they joked about a Christmas party that secretly took place at 10 Downing Street while the country was in a lockdown. He later revealed an email inviting Downing Street staff to a party in the garden in May 2020.

Following Laura Kuenssberg's announcement of her departure as political editor of BBC News, Brand was described in the media as a frontrunner for the position. According to The Times, "several industry sources" claimed he had been approached by the BBC in connection with the position. However, he agreed to stay on at ITV after being offered new roles, including as the presenter of Tonight. On 9 March 2022 he was confirmed to be the new presenter of Tonight, and succeeded Julie Etchingham in April. Etchingham had decided to step down from Tonight to concentrate on ITV News at Ten and documentary projects. Brand also continued in his role as UK editor. He was reported to have agreed to a "substantial pay rise" for his new roles.

Brand first reported a photograph from November 2020 of Prime Minister Boris Johnson raising a glass at a party. It was suggested on social media that Brand's husband Joe Cuddeford was the source of the photograph. Cuddeford is a civil servant working at the Geospatial Commission, a government body which is part of the Cabinet Office. Brand used Twitter to deny claims that his source is a family member, and said he had been subjected to homophobic abuse and disinformation by internet trolls. He stated that his husband had not received a fixed penalty notice or attended any parties.

Brand was a guest presenter of Good Morning Britain on 18 and 19 August 2022, where he presented with Kate Garraway and Ranvir Singh.

Awards
Brand won the Broadcaster of the Year award at the 2019 PinkNews awards for his investigations into gay conversion therapy. 

Brand won an Excellence in Journalism Award from Press Gazette in July 2020 for his investigations which revealed that patients were being discharged from hospitals into care homes without being tested for COVID-19. He won the Political Journalist of the Year award at the 2020 British Journalism Awards, alongside Dominique Heckels, for their reporting on the impact of COVID-19 in care homes.

Brand won Political Journalist of the Year at the RTS Television Journalism Awards 2023.

References

External links

|-

Living people
21st-century British journalists
Alumni of the University of Oxford
Alumni of City, University of London
British political journalists
ITN newsreaders and journalists
ITV people
Welsh LGBT journalists
People from Bridgend
Welsh male journalists
Year of birth missing (living people)
21st-century Welsh LGBT people